Denise "Saucy Wow" Belfon (born 23 November 1968, in Trinidad) is a soca and contemporary R&B songwriter and dancer.

Early years
As a young girl in school, she was a football (soccer) player and was offered a scholarship to Howard University to join the all-girls team. However, an injury at the time prevented her from taking up the opportunity. She has been singing since the age of nine, and was also a dancer and a model. When she was not performing, Belfon taught gymnastics at the Belmont Junior Secondary school and at the YMCA.
Belfon is of Saint Lucian and Trinidadian descent, but also has Grenadian, Barbadian, Jamaican, French, and African ancestry.

Singing career
In 1990, Belfon was discovered by the bandleader of Roy Cape. She started singing professionally with the soca band Black Sheep, before moving on to Sound Revolution. Her first solo recording was the soca single "Ka Ka Lay Lay". (Not to be confused with Makelele which of  course is Alison Hinds' crop over 2011 song ) Belfon went on to record the singles "Hard Wuk", "De Jammette", "Saucy Baby", and "Indian Man". Belfon has also recorded songs outside of the soca genre, most notably a 2001 collaboration with New York house music duo Masters at Work entitled "Work".

References

External links
 Denise Belfon Profile at TriniJungleJuice.com
 Read the profile of Denise Belfon on Trinibeat.com

1968 births
Living people
21st-century Trinidad and Tobago women singers
21st-century Trinidad and Tobago singers
Contemporary R&B singers
20th-century Trinidad and Tobago women singers
20th-century Trinidad and Tobago singers